Samuel Barnett (born 25 April 1980) is an English actor. He has performed on stage, film, television and radio and achieved recognition for his work on the stage and film versions of The History Boys by Alan Bennett. His television performances include roles in the BBC comedy Twenty Twelve and in the Showtime drama Penny Dreadful. He played the lead role of Dirk Gently in Dirk Gently's Holistic Detective Agency, the 2016 BBC America adaptation of the book series by Douglas Adams.

Early life
Barnett was born in Whitby, North Yorkshire, on 25 April 1980. He has four siblings. His mother comes from a Quaker background whilst his father was descended from Polish Jews. He started performing at an early age before moving to London to study acting at the London Academy of Music and Dramatic Art (LAMDA).

Career
Barnett appeared in the original London stage production of Alan Bennett's 2004 play The History Boys, as well as in the New York, Sydney, Wellington and Hong Kong productions and radio and film versions of the play. He had been involved in The History Boys from its very first reading.

In 2009 Barnett played John Everett Millais in the BBC series Desperate Romantics and Joseph Severn in the film Bright Star. He appeared at the National Theatre in Women Beware Women by Thomas Middleton, which ran from 20 April – 4 July 2010. From July 2012 he appeared in an all-male-cast as Queen Elizabeth in Shakespeare's Richard III at Shakespeare's Globe in London alongside Mark Rylance in the title role, also playing the role of Sebastian in Twelfth Night. The production transferred to the Apollo Theatre in the West End, opening on 2 November 2012 and running for a limited engagement. Both Twelfth Night and Richard III transferred to Broadway in 2013 and played at the Belasco Theatre until February 2014. In the Broadway productions Barnett reprised his role as Elizabeth Woodville in Richard III and took on the role of Viola (previously played by Johnny Flynn in London) in Twelfth Night. In July 2018 Barnett reunited with History Boys playwright Alan Bennett and co-star Sacha Dhawan for Bennett's new play, Allelujah!, at the Bridge Theatre.

Recognition and awards
Barnett was nominated for Evening Standard Award as Most Promising Newcomer for his role in The Marriage of Figaro in 2002. He won Best Newcomer & Best Supporting Actor in a play at the Whatsonstage.com Theatregoers Choice Awards for his work on the original production of The History Boys. He was nominated for the 29th annual Olivier Award for Best Performance in a Supporting Role. He won a Drama Desk Award and was nominated for a Tony Award for his work on the Broadway production.

Barnett was nominated for the 2006 British Independent Film Award for Most Promising Newcomer (On Screen) for his work on the film version of The History Boys.

In 2014 Barnett received a nomination for a Tony Award for Best Actor in a Play for his work in Twelfth Night.

In 2022 Barnett received the Stage Edinburgh Award for excellence in acting for his role in the solo-show Feeling Afraid As If Something Terrible Is Going To Happen.

Personal life 
Barnett is openly gay and in a relationship with theatre director Adam Penford. In 2020 his father died from COVID-19.

Credits

Theatre

Television

Film

Radio

Audio drama

Soundtrack

Video games

References

External links
 
 

1980 births
Alumni of the London Academy of Music and Dramatic Art
Drama Desk Award winners
English male film actors
English people of Polish-Jewish descent
English male radio actors
English male stage actors
English male television actors
Living people
English LGBT actors
Actors from Whitby
20th-century English LGBT people
21st-century English male actors
21st-century English LGBT people
Male actors from Yorkshire
English gay actors